is a railway station in Engaru, Monbetsu, Hokkaidō Prefecture, Japan. Its station number is A51.

Lines
Hokkaido Railway Company
Sekihoku Main Line

Adjacent stations

Railway stations in Hokkaido Prefecture
Railway stations in Japan opened in 1914

References